β-Methyl-2C-B (BMB) is a recreational designer drug with psychedelic effects. It is a structural isomer of DOB but is considerably less potent, having around half the potency of 2C-B itself with activity starting at a dosage of around 20 mg. It has two possible enantiomers but their activity has not been tested separately.

See also 
 βk-2C-B
 BOB (psychedelic)
 TCB-2
 ZC-B

References 

Designer drugs
Psychedelic phenethylamines
Serotonin receptor agonists